The Architectural Review is a monthly international architectural magazine. It has been published in London since 1896. Its articles cover the built environment – which includes landscape, building design, interior design and urbanism – as well as theory of these subjects.

History

The Architectural Review was founded as a monthly magazine, the Architectural Review for the Artist and Craftsman, in 1896 by Percy Hastings, owner of the Architectural Press, with an editorial board of Reginald Blomfield, Mervyn Macartney and Ernest Newton. In 1927 his third son, Hubert de Cronin Hastings, became joint editor (with Christian Berman) of both The Architectural Review and the Architects' Journal, a weekly. Together they made substantial changes to the aims and style of the review, which became a general arts magazine with an architectural emphasis. Contributors from other artistic fields were brought in, among them Hilaire Belloc, Robert Byron, Cyril Connolly, D.H. Lawrence, Paul Nash, Nikolaus Pevsner, P. Morton Shand, Osbert and Sacheverell Sitwell, and Evelyn Waugh. John Betjeman was an assistant editor from 1930 to 1934. The editorial board included Pevsner, Hugh Casson, Osbert Lancaster and James Maude Richards. The design of the review was innovative, with bold use of layout, typefaces and photographs; graphic elements were commissioned from Eric Gill and Edward Bawden. The articles on European Modernist architecture by P. Morton Shand published from July 1934 were among the earliest in Britain on the subject. By about 1935 the magazine had acquired a leading position in the discourse surrounding Modernism.

The journal was influential after the Second World War in raising awareness of "townscape" (urban design), partly through regular articles by assistant editor Gordon Cullen, author of several books on the subject.

In January 2017, title owner Ascential announced its intention to sell 13 titles including The Architectural Review; the 13 "heritage titles" were to be "hived off into a separate business while buyers are sought." It was one of 13 titles acquired from Ascential by Metropolis International in a £23.5m cash deal, announced on 1 June 2017.

The Architectural Review remains in print, published ten times per year, while its online version is updated daily.

Notable people
Dariush Borbor (architect and urban planner) – former correspondent and contributor 1960s to 1980s
Henry Wilson – first editor 1896–1901
John Betjeman – assistant editor, 1930 to 1934
James Maude Richards – co-editor or editor, 1935 to 1971, excluding the war years
Nikolaus Pevsner – acting editor 1943 to 1945 and member of editorial board 1945 to 1970
Peter Davey – Editor 1980 to 2005
László Moholy-Nagy – photographer
Gordon Cullen – art editor
Robert Melville – art critic
Peter Blundell Jones – contributor
Stephen Gardiner – contributor
Douglass Haskell – contributor
Ian Nairn – contributor
Catherine Slessor, managing editor 1992 – 2009, editor 2010 – 2015 
Christine Murray, editor, 2015 – 2018
Manon Mollard, editor

References

Architecture magazines
Ascential
Monthly magazines published in the United Kingdom
1896 establishments in the United Kingdom
Magazines established in 1896
Architecture in the United Kingdom